Beggars Group is a British record company that owns or distributes several other labels, including 4AD, Rough Trade Records, Matador Records, XL Recordings and Young.

History
Founded by Martin Mills, Beggars' roots stem from the Beggars Banquet record shops, which first opened in 1973 with a shop in Earls Court, London. In 1977, spurred by the prevailing DIY aesthetics of the British punk rock movement (then at the height of its popularity), the shop founders decided to join the fray as an independent label and release records as Beggars Banquet Records, which became the group's flagship label and namesake.  The first band on the label was English punk group The Lurkers; the first ever release on the label was The Lurkers' punk classic "Shadow"/"Love Story" 7" single.  Later in the decade and into the early 1980s, hits with Tubeway Army and Gary Numan secured the label's future. Beggars Banquet then went on to release music by Bauhaus, Biffy Clyro, Buffalo Tom, The Charlatans, The Cult, The Go-Betweens, The National, St. Vincent and Tindersticks.

In August of 2002, it was announced that Beggars Group had purchased a 50% stake in Matador Records.

In 2007, it was reported that Beggars had purchased Rough Trade Records.

Ownership
The Beggars Group has been in business for over forty years and is owned and managed by Martin Mills. Its musical focus remains fiercely alternative. As of 2017, the main labels that form the group are 4AD, Matador Records, Rough Trade Records, XL Recordings and Young. The company owns 4AD (the label itself a Beggars Banquet imprint) outright, and retains a 50% stake in each of the others. Older labels within the group, including Beggars Banquet itself and Too Pure, are now part of Beggars Arkive, which is the catalogue department for its labels that are no longer active.

Independence
With its own worldwide network in place, unique in the independent sector, the Group now has three offices in London (two of which also house recording studios), two in the US (New York and Los Angeles), and a dedicated office in every major territory. The company has also been actively involved in helping to promote the collective interests of the sector, being founding members of the AIM (UK) in 1999, IMPALA (Europe) in 2000, A2IM (USA), and most recently the Worldwide Independent Network, each of which represent the interests of the independent music industry. The Beggars Group are also active members of Merlin, the independents’ rights licensing body.

Martin Mills
Martin Mills has become known as a fierce advocate for independent label rights, and testified before the Senate Subcommittee on Antitrust Competition Policy and Consumer Rights hearing against the Universal Music Group-EMI merger. In 2011, The Guardian named him #22 in their "Music Power 100. He was given the "Industry Icon" award by Billboard (magazine) at Midem in 2013. In 2014, Martin was given the Pioneer Award at the 2014 AIM Independent Music Awards. He has been listed on Billboard's "Power 100" several times including #63 in 2015, #66 in 2014, and #64 in 2013. Variety Magazine named him one of the International Music Leaders of 2018. He is a founding member of Impala, on the boards of A2IM, Merlin, and AIM, and in 2018 was appointed to a brand new role, Chair of WIN, the Worldwide Independent Network representing the interests of the global independent music community.

Current group artists
The main labels that are part of the Beggars Group are home to a range of artists including:

4AD
 Aldous Harding
 Atlas Sound
 Beirut
 Bing & Ruth
 Bon Iver (in Europe only; Jagjaguwar in US)
 The Breeders
 Camera Obscura
 Daughter
 David Byrne & St. Vincent
 Deerhunter
 D.D Dumbo
 Efterklang (worldwide through 4AD; Rumraket in Scandinavia)
 EL VY
 Future Islands
 Gang Gang Dance
 Grimes
 Holly Herndon
 Tim Hecker
 Iron & Wine (in Europe, Japan, New Zealand and Australia; Warner Bros. in North America)
 John Moreland
 The Lemon Twigs
 LNZNDRF
 Merchandise
 Methyl Ethel
 The National
 Pixx
 Purity Ring
 SOHN
 Torres
 Tune-Yards
 U.S. Girls
 Scott Walker

Matador Records
 Algiers
 Belle and Sebastian
 Body/Head
 Car Seat Headrest
 Cat Power
 Ceremony
 Chavez
 Courtney Barnett & Kurt Vile
 Darkside
 Helium
 Hælos
 Iceage
 Interpol
 Julien Baker
 Kurt Vile
 Lucy Dacus
 Paul Banks
 Pavement
 Perfume Genius
 Queens of the Stone Age
 Savages
 Snail Mail
 Spoon
 Stephen Malkmus and the Jicks
 Steve Gunn
 Yo La Tengo

Rough Trade Records
 Alabama Shakes
 Antony and the Johnsons
 Black Midi
 British Sea Power
 Dean Blunt
 Dylan LeBlanc
 Emiliana Torrini
 Gilla Band
 Goat Girl
 Honey Hahs
 Houndmouth
 Jarvis Cocker
 Jeffrey Lewis
 jennylee
 Josienne Clarke & Ben Walker
 Lankum
 Micachu & The Shapes
 Mica Levi
 Palma Violets
 Pantha Du Prince
 Parquet Courts
 PicaPica
 The Prettiots
 Princess Nokia
 Scritti Politti
 Sleaford Mods
 SOAK
 Starcrawler
 This Is the Kit
 Warpaint

XL Recordings
 Adele
 Arca
 Atoms for Peace
 Everything Is Recorded
 Gila
 Hugo Massien
 Ibeyi
 Jack White
 Jai Paul
 Jungle
 King Krule
 Kaytranada
 Kurupt FM
 Nines
 Overmono
 Powell
 Radiohead
 Ratatat
 RATKING
 Sam Gellaitry
 Sigur Rós
 Smerz
 Special Request
 Thom Yorke
 Wiki

Young
 Daniela Lalita
 Ethan P. Flynn
 FKA Twigs
 Jamie xx
 John Talabot
 Kamasi Washington
 Koreless
 Oliver Sim
 Romy
 Sampha
 The xx

References

External links
 
 Canadian website